The Junior men's race at the 2019 IAAF World Cross Country Championships was held at the Aarhus in Denmark, on March 30, 2019. Milkesa Mengesha from Ethiopia won the gold medal by two seconds from fellow countryman Tadese Worku while Ugandan runner, Oscar Chelimo finished a second later in third.

Race results

Junior men's race (8 km)

Individual

See also
 2019 IAAF World Cross Country Championships – Senior men's race
 2019 IAAF World Cross Country Championships – Senior women's race
 2019 IAAF World Cross Country Championships – Junior women's race
 2019 IAAF World Cross Country Championships – Mixed relay

References

Junior men's race at the World Athletics Cross Country Championships
2019 IAAF World Cross Country Championships